Dar Salim (born 18 August 1977) is a Danish actor. He received a Bodil Award nomination in the category Best Actor for the film Go With Peace, Jamil in 2008.

Early life
Dar Salim was born in Baghdad, Iraq. He fled to Denmark as a six-year-old refugee and lived on Amager. After high school he worked as a tour guide and did his mandatory military service with the Royal Guard. He's also a trained pilot.

Acting 
Today, Salim is known for his work as a film and television actor. He trained at the William Esper Studio in New York and also studied method acting in London. He also had private lessons with actress Sarah Boberg. His acting career started with being cast in TV2's television series Forsvar. The role that probably gave him the greatest exposure among Danish television viewers was as the Green Party chairman in Borgen. In early 2013, he presented TV2's Good Evening Denmark, and has also starred in TV2's crime drama Dicte, for which he received a Best Supporting Actor nomination at the Robert Awards.

Salim has also had recurring roles in Danish thrillers The Bridge and Below the Surface. He also co-starred in the Swedish TV series Springfloden (Spring Tide).

Personal life 
Salim lives in Copenhagen. He has a son.

Filmography

Films

TV series

References

External links

 Bodil nominerer oversete Jamil(in Danish)
 Hovedrolle i en drengedrøm (in Danish)

1977 births
Danish male actors
Living people
People from Baghdad
Danish people of Iraqi descent
Iraqi emigrants to Denmark
Danish aviators